Dmytro Blazheyovskyi (Ukrainian: Дмитро Блажейовський; 21 August 1910 – 23 April 2011) was a Ukrainian Catholic priest and writer. Blazheyovskyi authored over twenty-five scholarly articles on the history of the Ukrainian church. He died in Lviv, aged 100.

Blazheyovskyi was well known in Ukraine for his numerous sketches of traditional Ukrainian embroidery. Throughout his life, Blazheyovskyi had exhibitions of his work in his home country and abroad. On 6 May 1999, he opened a museum in Lviv. He was awarded with the Shevchenko National Prize.

Biography
Father Doctor Dmytro Blazheyovskyi was born in 1910 in Wisłok Wielki, Sianik, Lemkivshchyna. He studied in the Gymnasium in Przemyśl (1922-1930). He studied Philosophy, Theology, and History in 1933-1946 at Catholic universities in Rome, completed two doctoral studies (in Theology (1942) – the University of the Urbaniana; in History (1946) – the Gregorian University). He was ordained on 2 April 1939 in Rome.

After, he worked as a priest among the Ukrainian diaspora in the United States of America – Ansonia, Connecticut (1946–47), St. Joseph, Missouri (1947-55), Omaha and Lincoln, Nebraska, Denver, Colorado; and organized parishes in those cities in 1950-1955; Denver (1955–58), Philadelphia, Pennsylvania (1958–59), Houston, Texas (1959-73).

After 1973, he published twenty-five scientific, ten articles in History of the Church, and Ukrainian Religious Embroiders, fourteen albums of embroidered designs. Upon Ukraine's independence from the Soviet Union, Blazejowskyj began to bring exhibitions of his icons and gonfalons.

Last years and death
From 1992-2010, he held 170 exhibitions of embroidered icons in Ukraine and 55 exhibitions outside Ukraine. On 6 May 1999, he opened his museum of embroidered icons in Lviv. Until 2010 he lived in Rome, where he celebrated his 100th anniversary and the 70th anniversary of priest work. He solemnly celebrated his 100th anniversary in Lviv; the celebration was held on 20 August 2010 at the Maria Zankovetska Theater. He died on Easter Saturday, 23 April 2011, at the age of 101. Dmytro Blazejowskyj is buried at Yaniv Cemetery, Lviv.

Publications
 Власть Київських Митрополитів над монахами (1596—1809). — Рим (Rome), 1973
 Українська і вірменська папські семінарії у Львові (1665—1784). — Рим, 1975
 Митрополії, епархії і екзархати візантійсько-київського обряду. Номенклатура і статистика. — Рим, 1980
 Студенти візантійсько-київського обряду в папських колегіях і семінаріях, університетах та інститутах Центральної і Західної Европи. — Рим, 1984
 Шематизм Української Католицької Церкви у діаспорі. — Рим, 1988
 Українське католицьке духовенство у діаспорі (1751—1988). — Рим, 1988
 Ієрархія Київської Церкви (861—1990). — Рим, 1990
 Українська Папська Мала Семінарія св. Йосафата у Римі (1951—1990). — Рим, 1990
 Берестейська Ре-Унія та українська історична доля i недоля. — Львів (Lvov), 1995
 Історичний шематизм Перемиської Епархії з включенням Апостольської Адміністратури Лемківщини (1828—1939). — Львів, 1995, 
 Альбом вишиваних ікон та образів. — Львів, 1999
 Мої рефлексії щодо проблем минулого, теперішнього і будущності українського народу. — Львів, 2010

References

1910 births
2011 deaths
People from Sanok County
Ukrainian Eastern Catholic priests
Ukrainian centenarians
Ukrainian historians of religion
Polish emigrants to the United States
Pontifical Urban University alumni
Pontifical Gregorian University alumni
20th-century Eastern Catholic clergy
21st-century Eastern Catholic clergy
Men centenarians
Eastern Catholic writers
Museum founders
Embroidery
Collectors
Historians of the Catholic Church
Folklore writers
20th-century art collectors
21st-century art collectors
Christian iconography
Ukrainian Austro-Hungarians
Ukrainians in Poland
American historians of religion
American emigrants to Ukraine
Burials at Yaniv Cemetery